New Jersey's 1st legislative district is one of 40 in the state, covering the Atlantic County municipalities of Corbin City, Estell Manor City and Weymouth Township; the Cape May County municipalities of Avalon Borough, Cape May City, Cape May Point Borough, Dennis Township, Lower Township, Middle Township, North Wildwood City, Ocean City, Sea Isle City, Stone Harbor Borough, Upper Township, West Cape May Borough, West Wildwood Borough, Wildwood City, Wildwood Crest Borough and Woodbine Borough; and the Cumberland County communities of Commercial Township, Downe Township, Fairfield Township, Greenwich Township, Hopewell Township, Lawrence Township, Maurice River Township, Millville City, Shiloh Borough, Stow Creek Township and Vineland City as of the 2011 apportionment.

Demographic characteristics
As of the 2020 United States census, the district had a population of 216,124, of whom 173,507 (80.3%) were of voting age. The racial makeup of the district was 148,837 (68.9%) White, 23,585 (10.9%) African American, 1,536 (0.7%) Native American, 2,710 (1.3%) Asian, 42 (0.0%) Pacific Islander, 18,897 (8.7%) from some other race, and 20,517 (9.5%) from two or more races. Hispanic or Latino of any race were 42,561 (19.7%) of the population.

The district had 159,989 registered voters as of December 1, 2021, of whom 56,832 (35.5%) were registered as unaffiliated, 52,965 (33.1%) were registered as Republicans, 47,584 (29.7%) were registered as Democrats, and 2,608 (1.6%) were registered to other parties.

Political representation
The district is represented for the 2022–2023 Legislative Session in the State Senate by Mike Testa (R, Vineland) and in the General Assembly by Antwan McClellan (R, Ocean City) and Erik K. Simonsen (R, Lower Township).

It is entirely located within New Jersey's 2nd congressional district.

1965–1973
During the period of time after the 1964 Supreme Court decision in Reynolds v. Sims and before the establishment of a 40-district legislature in 1973, the 1st District encompassed the entirety of Atlantic, Cape May, and Gloucester counties in the 1965–1967 Senate session (two Senators elected), and Cape May and Cumberland counties in the Senate and Assembly sessions from 1967 through 1973 (one Senator and two Assembly members elected).

In the 1965-1967 Senate session, Republicans John E. Hunt and Frank S. Farley were elected though one seat of the two would become vacant upon Hunt's election to the House of Representatives. In the following two Senate sessions, Republican Robert E. Kay was elected in 1967 for a four-year term followed by Republican James Cafiero for a two-year term in 1971.

For the two-year Assembly sessions from 1967 until 1973, Republicans held both seats for the three Assembly elections during this period with Cafiero and James R. Hurley winning in the 1967 and 1969 elections and Hurley and Joseph W. Chinnici winning in 1971.

District composition since 1973
For the first iteration of the 1st District implemented under the 40 equal districts plan, the district once again encompassed all of Cape May and Cumberland counties. For the sessions following the 1980 Census, the 1st included all of Cape May, but only included the Cumberland County cities of Bridgeton, Millville, and Vineland, and the townships of Deerfield, Maurice River, and Upper Deerfield. The 1991 iteration of the 1st included all of Cape May, only Maurice River Township, Millville, and Vineland in Cumberland, and added Buena and Buena Vista Township in Atlantic County. With the exception of adding Atlantic County's Somers Point, the 2001 iteration of the 1st remained the same as the 1991 district.

Election history

Notes:

Election results, 1973–present

Senate

General Assembly

Election results, 1965–1973

Senate

General Assembly

References

Atlantic County, New Jersey
Cape May County, New Jersey
Cumberland County, New Jersey
01